Mountleigh was a property development and dealing company formerly listed on the London Stock Exchange. The company grew from a small textiles company to be one of the largest property trading companies in Britain under the chairmanship of Tony Clegg before being sold after the 1990s property crash.

References

Companies formerly listed on the London Stock Exchange